Gao Xin and Zhang Zhizhen were the defending champions but lost in the quarterfinals to Gong Maoxin and Zhang Ze.

Gong and Zhang Ze won the title after Bradley Mousley and Akira Santillan withdrew before the final.

Seeds

Draw

References
 Main Draw

International Challenger Zhangjiagang - Doubles
2018 Doubles